Kepong is a town in northern Kuala Lumpur, Malaysia. The name is a Malay word meaning "Enclose" or "Surround", as the town is surrounded by a mountain range.

Places of interest
 FRIM Kepong (Forest Research Institute Malaysia)
 Temasek Pewter Factory, Jalan Kuang Bulan, Taman Kepong
 Chinese Temples in Kepong
 Samnak Sambodhi Buddhist Temple 
 Kepong Metropolitan Park, 90 hectares in total size, one of the largest parks in Kuala Lumpur. Easy access from Batu Caves direction of Middle Ring Road 2, exit to Kepong before elevated bridge, visible from the highway
 Taman Rekreasi (Lake Gardens) Bandar Menjalara
 Central Park in Desa Park City

Infrastructure
DUKE Highway Phase 2, a 7.4 km elevated tolled highway which connects Bandar Sri Damansara and Segambut. This highway has interchanges located at Menjalara and Segambut.

Transportation

Public transport
There are two KTM stations:  Kepong station and the later built  Kepong Sentral station (which is a connecting station to the MRT Putrajaya line). Both stations are located on the KTM Komuter Port Klang Line. Kepong Sentral is also served by a limited number of ETS services (KL to Ipoh).

The MRT Putrajaya line has five stations serving Kepong, which are  Sri Damansara Timur (connecting station to Kepong Sentral KTM),  Metro Prima,  Kepong Baru,  Jinjang and  Sri Delima stations. The stations opened in June 2022 as part of the line's Phase One operation.

RapidKL, SJ Bus and Selangor Omnibus provides bus transport in the area.

Politics
Kepong is one of the 11 parliamentary constituencies of the federal territory of Kuala Lumpur represented in the Malaysian Parliament. The current Member of Parliament representing the constituency is Lim Lip Eng from the Pakatan Harapan-Democratic Action Party.

Community organisations
 Ti-Ratana Community Centre – Kepong
 Kepong Methodist Youth Fellowship
 Christ Evangelical Reformed Church - Kepong Growth Group

References

Suburbs in Kuala Lumpur